UBLS may refer to:
University of Botswana, Lesotho, and Swaziland
Uniformly bounded linearly stationary
United Bank Limited Pakistan's London Stock Exchange (international trading service) stock symbol

See also
UBL (disambiguation)